Smith v Hughes (1871) LR 6 QB 597 is an English contract law case. In it, Blackburn J set out his classic statement of the objective interpretation of people's conduct (acceptance by conduct) when entering into a contract. The case regarded a mistake made by Mr. Hughes, a horse trainer, who bought a quantity of oats that were the same as a sample he had been shown. However, Hughes had misidentified the kind of oats: his horse could not eat them, and refused to pay for them. Smith, the oat supplier, sued for Hughes to complete the sale as agreed. The court sided with Smith, as he provided the oats Hughes agreed to buy. That Hughes made a mistake was his own fault, as he had not been misled by Smith. Since Smith had made no fault, there was no mutual mistake, and the sale contract was still valid.

The case stands for the narrow proposition that in a commercial sale by sample (following sample) where the goods conform to the sample shown, the court will mindful of the principle of caveat emptor ("buyer beware") look more to objective than subjective consensus ad idem ("meeting of the minds"). Its wider proposition, not directly relevant to the facts of the case, and later substantially reduced, was that a consumer buying an item, such as "a horse", without a representation or warranty (any seller's statement or special term as to its condition) making his own assessment which "turns out unsound" cannot avoid, that is seek to obtain a refund on, the contract — see for example the largely consolidatory Consumer Rights Act 2015.

Facts
Mr. Hughes was a racehorse trainer. Mr. Smith, who was a farmer, brought him a sample of his oats, of which Hughes then ordered forty to fifty quarters at a fixed price. Sixteen quarters were sent to start with. But when they arrived, Hughes said they were not the oats he thought they would be. He had wanted old oats (which are the only ones racehorses can eat), and he was getting new oats (also known as green oats). In fact, Smith's sample was of green oats. Hughes refused to pay and Smith sued for damages for breach of contract, for the amount of oats delivered and still to be delivered. Later questions were put in this civil matter to jury (a procedure today largely abolished).

The jury convened locally at a County Court of Surrey, at Epsom. They initially found for Mr. Hughes that there was a mistake on his part. They were directed by the judge that if Mr. Hughes was under a mistake about the oats (thinking they were old when they were green oats) and Mr. Smith had known it, they should find in Mr. Hughes' favour. They therefore did so. Mr. Smith appealed.

Judgment
The Court of the Queen's Bench found that the jury had been misdirected and ordered a retrial. Leaning in Mr. Smith's favour, they held that the question was not merely whether the parties were at consensus ad idem (meeting of the minds), but what they had communicated by their conduct and words to one another. Mr. Smith was held to be under no duty to inform Mr. Hughes of his possible mistake about the kind of oats, reaffirming the old idea of caveat emptor (buyer beware). A unilateral mistake is therefore in principle no ground for rescission of a contract. Cockburn CJ gave the first judgment.

Then, Blackburn J, who came to be known as one of the great 19th century judges, agreeing, gave his decision on the issue.

Hannen J delivered a concurring judgment.

See also

Hotchkiss v National City Bank of New York, 200 F 287, 293 (SD NY 1911), per Judge Learned Hand, "A contract has, strictly speaking, nothing to do with the personal, or individual, intent of the parties. A contract is an obligation attached by the mere force of law to certain acts of the parties, usually words, which ordinarily accompany and represent a known intent. If, however, it were proved by twenty bishops that either party, when he used the words, intended something else than the usual meaning that the law imposes upon them, he would still be held, unless there were some mutual mistake or something else of the sort."
Hillas & Co Ltd v Arcos Ltd [1932] UKHL 2
Hartog v Colin & Shields [1939] 3 All ER 566
Frederick E Rose (London) Ltd v William H Pim Junior & Co Ltd [1953] 2 QB 450

Notes and references
References

Notes

1871 in case law
Lord Blackburn cases
English agreement case law
English interpretation case law
1871 in British law
Oats
Court of King's Bench (England) cases